Best Adventures is a compilation album by Australian band, Pseudo Echo, released in October 1995, spanning the band's entire career.

Background
Pseudo Echo was established in Melbourne in 1982 by Brian Canham, Pierre Pierre and Tony Lugton. Anthony Argiro joined in 1983. They were the first unsigned band to appear on the TV show Countdown, where they performed their track, "Listening". Following this performance, the band signed a record deal with EMI Australia. The band went on to release three studio albums and accrued 9 gold and platinum awards. The band disbanded in November 1989.

Track listing

References

Pseudo Echo albums
1995 greatest hits albums
Compilation albums by Australian artists
Albums produced by Peter Dawkins (musician)